The Wysshorn is a mountain in the Bernese Alps.

External links
 List of mountains above 2000 m in Switzerland with coordinates

Bernese Alps
Mountains of the Alps
Alpine three-thousanders
Mountains of Valais
Mountains of Switzerland